"Les Bêtises" (French translation for "Stupid Things") is a 1985 song recorded by French artist Sabine Paturel. Released in March 1986 as her debut single from her album Cœur Bébé, released two years later, on which it is the sixth track. The song was a smash hit in France, even if it failed to top the chart. It was covered by several artists throughout the years and became a popular song.

Song information
Written and composed by Sylvain Lebel and Dominique Pankratoff, "Les Bêtises" is a song recorded as a nursery rhyme. It was qualified as full of mischievousness that could be subtitled "the rhyme of a calamity". In the lyrics, "the performer tells the disasters which she carried out to punish her boyfriend for having left her". Paturel performs the song with a childlike voice.

As proof of its notability, the song was included on many French compilations released in the 2000s, such as Absolument 80 : Tubes français vol. 1, Nostalgie Classiques 80, Nos années 80 - Platinum Collection, Top 50 - Vol. 2 and Les 100 plus grands tubes 80's.

Chart performances
In France, "Les Bêtises" debuted at number 50 on the chart edition of 22 March 1986, climbed quickly and entered the top ten in its sixth week, where it remained for 19 weeks with a peak at number two for five consecutive weeks, but was unable to dislodge Princess Stéphanie of Monaco's hit "Ouragan" which topped the chart then; it fell off the top 50 after 30 weeks of presence. On the 1986 year-end chart, the song ranked number three, behind "Les Démons de minuit" and "Ouragan".

Cover versions
The song was covered in 2006 by Bébé Lilly. Produced by Teetoff, the song was the second single from the album Mon monde à moi and was released on 2 June 2006. This version, released in a CD single version, achieved success in France where it was a top eight hit and remained on the chart (top 100) for twenty weeks. It charted for two weeks in Switzerland and peaked at number 90. "Les Bêtises" was also covered by Leslie on her cover album 80 Souvenirs. In 2010, Les Enfoirés recorded a cover of the song for their album La Crise de nerfs! ; the singers on this version are Jean-Louis Aubert, Zazie, Jean-Jacques Goldman, Jean-Baptiste Maunier and Jenifer Bartoli.

Track listings
 7" single
 "Les Bêtises" — 3:00
 "J'crois que j't'aime" — 3:15

Charts and certifications

Weekly charts

Year-end charts

Certifications

References

1985 songs
2006 singles
Sabine Paturel songs
Bébé Lilly songs
1986 debut singles
Heben Music singles